Shoot Me in the Heart is a 2015 South Korean drama film directed by Mun Che-yong, and starring Lee Min-ki and Yeo Jin-goo. It is based on the bestselling novel of the same name by Jeong Yu-jeong, which won the Segye Literature Award in 2009.

Plot
Soo-myung and Seung-min, both 25 years old, meet for the first time at Soori Hope Hospital, a run-down psychiatric facility located on a mountain. Soo-myung has been institutionalized since he was nineteen after the trauma caused by his mother's suicide, and has a phobia of scissors. Seung-min is a sane and champion paraglider, but was forcibly committed by his greedy half-brother to get Seung-min's share of the family inheritance. Soo-myung is a model patient, peacefully and passively spending his days in the hospital despite its abusive nurses, unlike Seung-min, who is a walking time bomb. Soon, Soo-myung gets roped into Seung-min's reckless plan to break out of the hospital.

Cast
Lee Min-ki as Seung-min
Yeo Jin-goo as Soo-myung
Yu Oh-seong as Choi Ki-hoon
Kim Jung-tae as Kim Yong
Kim Gi-cheon as Man-sik
Shin Goo as Ascetic Sibwoonsan
Song Young-chang as Director of psychiatric hospital
Park Choong-seon as Depressed cleaner
Park Doo-shik as Jeom Bak-yi
Han Hye-rin as Yoon Bo-ra
Kim Jae-hwa as Princess Buckingham
Choi Yoon-Bin as Patient 1
Kim Seon-ha as Patient 2
Lee Jun-hyeok as Street musician

Production
Filming began on May 1, 2014, and wrapped three months later on July 27 in Jeonju.

Awards and nominations

References

External links

2015 films
South Korean drama films
Films based on South Korean novels
2010s South Korean films